The 2022 season was South East Stars' third season, in which they competed in the 50 over Rachael Heyhoe Flint Trophy and the Twenty20 Charlotte Edwards Cup. In the Charlotte Edwards Cup, the side finished top of Group A, winning five of their six matches and progressing to the semi-final. In the semi-final, they lost to Central Sparks by 2 wickets. In the Rachael Heyhoe Flint Trophy, the side finished second in the group, winning five of their seven matches and progressing to the play-off. In the play-off, they lost to Southern Vipers by 6 wickets.
 
The side was captained by Bryony Smith, who replaced Tash Farrant in the position at the start of the season, and coached by Johann Myburgh. They played five home matches at the County Ground, Beckenham and two at Woodbridge Road, Guildford.

Squad

Changes
On 29 October 2021, it was announced that Alice Capsey and Danielle Gregory had been awarded professional contracts with the side, having previously been on temporary contracts. On 1 November 2021, Susie Rowe retired from all forms of cricket. On 18 March 2022, it was announced that Hannah Jones was taking an indefinite break from cricket. South East Stars announced their 20-player squad for the season on 9 May 2022, with the addition of Claudie Cooper being the only change from the 2021 squad. On the same day, it was announced that Bryony Smith would be taking over the captaincy of the side from Tash Farrant. On 16 July 2022, Academy players Sydney Gorham, Bethan Miles and Megan Sturge, and overseas player Lauren Smith were all named in a matchday squad for the first time. On 8 September 2022, Academy players Madeleine Blinkhorn-Jones and Jemima Spence were named in a matchday squad for the first time.

Squad list
 Age given is at the start of South East Stars' first match of the season (14 May 2022).

Charlotte Edwards Cup

Group A

 advanced to the semi-final

Fixtures

Semi-final

Tournament statistics

Batting

Source: ESPN Cricinfo Qualification: 50 runs.

Bowling

Source: ESPN Cricinfo Qualification: 5 wickets.

Rachael Heyhoe Flint Trophy

Season standings

 advanced to final
 advanced to the play-off

Fixtures

Play-off

Tournament statistics

Batting

Source: ESPN Cricinfo Qualification: 100 runs.

Bowling

Source: ESPN Cricinfo Qualification: 5 wickets.

Season statistics

Batting

Bowling

Fielding

Wicket-keeping

References

South East Stars seasons
2022 in English women's cricket